Robert Bagley Priestley (January 5, 1920 – May 20, 2015) was an American football end who played one season with the Philadelphia Eagles of the National Football League. He played college football at the Brown University and attended Melrose High School in Melrose, Massachusetts. In 1979, he was inducted into the Brown Athletic Hall of Fame. Priestley also was a coach of ice hockey and football at Norwich University. He was also on the selection committee for the United States men's national ice hockey team that represented the nation in the 1980 Winter Olympics. He died at the age of 95 on May 20, 2015.

References

1920 births
2015 deaths
American football ends
Philadelphia Eagles players
Brown Bears football players
Sportspeople from Everett, Massachusetts
Players of American football from Massachusetts